Jan Hus (1370 – 6 July 1415), sometimes anglicized as John Hus or John Huss, and referred to in historical texts as Iohannes Hus or Johannes Huss, was a Czech theologian and philosopher who became a Church reformer and the inspiration of Hussitism, a key predecessor to Protestantism, and a seminal figure in the Bohemian Reformation. Hus is considered by some to be the first Church reformer, even though some designate the theorist John Wycliffe. His teachings had a strong influence, most immediately in the approval of a reformed Bohemian religious denomination and, over a century later, on Martin Luther. Hus was a master, dean and rector at the Charles University in Prague between 1409 and 1410.

Jan Hus was born in Husinec, Bohemia, to poor parents. In order to escape poverty, Hus trained for the priesthood. At an early age he traveled to Prague, where he supported himself by singing and serving in churches. His conduct was positive and, reportedly, his commitment to his studies was remarkable. After earning a Bachelor of Arts degree and being ordained as a priest, Hus began to preach in Prague. He opposed many aspects of the Catholic Church in Bohemia, such as their views on ecclesiology, simony, the Eucharist, and other theological topics.

When Alexander V was elected as a pope, he was persuaded to side with Bohemian Church authorities against Hus and his disciples. He issued a Papal bull that excommunicated Hus; however, it was not enforced, and Hus continued to preach. Hus then spoke out against Alexander V's successor, Antipope John XXIII, for his selling of indulgences. Hus's excommunication was then enforced, and he spent the next two years living in exile. When the Council of Constance assembled, Hus was asked to be there and present his views on the dissension within the Church. When he arrived, with a promise of safe conduct, he was immediately arrested and put in prison. He was eventually taken in front of the council and asked to recant his views. He replied, "I would not for a chapel of gold retreat from the truth!". When he refused, he was put back in prison. On 6 July 1415, he was burned at the stake for heresy against the doctrines of the Catholic Church. He could be heard singing Psalms as he was burning. Among his dying words, Hus predicted that God would raise others whose calls for reform would not be suppressed; this was later taken as a prophecy about Martin Luther (born 68 years after Hus's death).

After Hus was executed, the followers of his religious teachings (known as Hussites) refused to elect another Catholic monarch and defeated five consecutive papal crusades between 1420 and 1431 in what became known as the Hussite Wars. Both the Bohemian and the Moravian populations remained majority Hussite until the 1620s, when a Protestant defeat in the Battle of the White Mountain resulted in the Lands of the Bohemian Crown coming under Habsburg dominion for the next 300 years and being subject to immediate and forced conversion in an intense campaign of return to Catholicism.

Early life
The exact date of Hus's birth is disputed. Some claim he was born around 1369, while others claim he was born between 1373 and 1375. Though older sources state the latter, more contemporary research states that 1372 is more likely. The belief that he was born on 6 July, also his death day, has no factual basis. Hus was born in Husinec, southern Bohemia, to peasant parents. It is well known that Hus took his name from the village where he lived (Husinec). The reason behind him taking his name from his village rather than from his father is up to speculation; some believe that it was because Hus did not know of his father, while others say it was simply a custom at that time. The name "Hus," however, means "goose" in Bohemian (now called Czech), and he was a century later referenced as a "Bohemian goose" in a dream given to Frederick, the Elector of Saxony. Nearly all other information we have about Hus's very early life is unsubstantiated. Similarly, we know little of Hus's family. His father's name was Michael; his mother's name is unknown. It is known that Hus had a brother due to him expressing concerns for his nephew while awaiting execution at Constance. Whether or not Hus had any other family is unknown.

At the age of roughly 10, Hus was sent away to a monastery. The exact reason is not known; some claim that his father had died, others say he went there due to his devotion to God. He impressed the teachers with his studies, and they recommended him to move to Prague, one of the largest cities in Bohemia at that time. Hus apparently supported himself by securing employment in Prague, which allowed him to fulfill his basic necessities, and access to the Prague Library.

Three years later, he was admitted to the University of Prague. Though not an exceptional student, he pursued his studies with ferocity. In 1393, Hus earned a Bachelor of Arts degree at the University of Prague, and he earned his master's degree in 1396. The strongly anti-papal views that were held by many of the professors there likely influenced Hus's future works. During his studies, he served as a choir boy, to supplement his earnings.

Career
Hus began teaching at the university of Prague in 1398 and in 1399, he first publicly defended propositions of Wycliffe. In 1401, his students and faculty promoted him to dean of the philosophical department, and a year later, he became a rector of the University of Prague. He was appointed a preacher at the Bethlehem Chapel in 1402. Hus was a strong advocate for the Czechs and the Realists, and he was influenced by the writings of John Wycliffe. Although church authorities banned many works of Wycliffe in 1403, Hus translated Trialogus into Czech and helped to distribute it.

Hus denounced the moral failings of clergy, bishops, and even the papacy from his pulpit. Archbishop Zbyněk Zajíc tolerated this, and even appointed Hus a preacher at the clergy's biennial synod. On 24 June 1405, Pope Innocent VII directed the Archbishop to counter Wycliffe's teachings, especially the doctrine of impanation in the Eucharist. The archbishop complied by issuing a synod decree against Wycliffe, as well as forbidding any further attacks on the clergy.

In 1406, two Bohemian students brought to Prague a document bearing the seal of the University of Oxford and praising Wycliffe. Hus proudly read the document from his pulpit. Then, in 1408, Pope Gregory XII warned Archbishop Zajic that the Church in Rome had been informed of Wycliffe's heresies and of the sympathies of King Wenceslaus IV of Bohemia for non-conformists. In response, the king and university ordered all of Wycliffe's writings surrendered to the archdiocesan chancery for correction. Hus obeyed, declaring that he condemned the errors in those writings.

Papal Schism
In 1408, the Charles University in Prague was divided by the Western Schism, in which Gregory XII in Rome and Benedict XIII in Avignon both claimed the papacy. Wenceslaus felt Gregory XII might interfere with his plans to be crowned Holy Roman Emperor. He denounced Gregory, ordered the clergy in Bohemia to observe a strict neutrality in the schism and said that he expected the same of the university. Archbishop Zajíc remained faithful to Gregory. At the University, only the scholars of the Bohemian "nation" (one of the four governing sections), with Hus as their leader, vowed neutrality.

Kutná Hora Decree

In January 1409, Wenceslaus summoned representatives of the four nations comprising the university to the Czech city of Kutná Hora to demand statements of allegiance. The Czech nation agreed, but the other three nations declined. The king then decreed that the Czech nation would have three votes in university affairs, while the "German nation" (composed of the former Bavarian, Saxon, and Polish nations) would have one vote in total. Due to the change in voting structure by May 1409 the German dean and rector were deposed and replaced by Czechs. The Palatine Elector called the Germans to his own University of Heidelberg, while the Margrave of Meissen started a new university in Leipzig. It is estimated that over one thousand students and masters left Prague. The emigrants also spread accusations of Bohemian heresy.

Antipope Alexander V

In 1409, the Council of Pisa tried to end the schism by electing Alexander V as Pope, but Gregory and Benedict did not submit. (Alexander was declared an "antipope" by the Council of Constance in 1418.) Hus, his followers, and Wenceslaus IV transferred their allegiance to Alexander V. Under pressure from
King Wenceslaus IV, Archbishop Zajíc did the same. Zajíc then lodged an accusation of "ecclesiastical disturbances" against Wycliffites in Prague with Alexander V.

On 20 December 1409, Alexander V issued a papal bull that empowered the Archbishop to proceed against Wycliffism in Prague. All copies of Wycliffe's writings were to be surrendered and his doctrines repudiated, and free preaching discontinued. After the publication of the bull in 1410, Hus appealed to Alexander V, but in vain. The Wycliffe books and valuable manuscripts were burned, and Hus and his adherents were excommunicated by Alexander V.

Crusade against Naples
Alexander V died in 1410, and was succeeded by John XXIII (also later declared an antipope). In 1411, John XXIII proclaimed a crusade against King Ladislaus of Naples, the protector of rival Pope Gregory XII. This crusade was preached in Prague as well. John XXIII also authorized indulgences to raise money for the war. Priests urged the people on and these crowded into churches to give their offerings. This traffic in indulgences was a sign of the corruption of the Church needing remediation.

Condemnation of indulgences and Crusade
Archbishop Zajíc died in 1411 and with his death the religious movement in Bohemia entered a new phase during which the disputes concerning indulgences assumed great importance. Hus spoke out against indulgences, but he could not carry with him the men of the university. In 1412, a dispute took place, on which occasion Hus delivered his address Quaestio magistri Johannis Hus de indulgentiis. It was taken literally from the last chapter of Wycliffe's book, De ecclesia, and his treatise, De absolutione a pena et culpa. Hus asserted that no pope or bishop had the right to take up the sword in the name of the Church; he should pray for his enemies and bless those that curse him; man obtains forgiveness of sins by true repentance, not money. The doctors of the theological faculty replied, but without success. A few days afterward some of Hus followers led by Vok Voksa z Valdštejna, burned the Papal bulls. Hus, they said, should be obeyed rather than the Church, which they considered a fraudulent mob of adulterers and Simonists.

In response, three men from the lower classes who openly called the indulgences a fraud were beheaded. They were later considered the first martyrs of the Hussite Church. In the meantime, the faculty had condemned the forty-five articles and added several other theses, deemed heretical, which had originated with Hus. The king forbade the teaching of these articles but neither Hus nor the university complied with the ruling. They requested that the articles should be first proven to be un-scriptural. The tumults at Prague had stirred up a sensation. Papal legates and Archbishop Albik tried to persuade Hus to give up his opposition to the papal bulls and the king made an unsuccessful attempt to reconcile the two parties.

Attempts at reconciliation
King Wenceslaus IV made efforts to harmonize the opposing parties. In 1412, he convoked the heads of his kingdom for a consultation and, at their suggestion, ordered a synod to be held at Český Brod on 2 February 1412. The synod was instead held in the palace of the archbishops at Prague in order to exclude Hus from participation. Propositions were made to restore peace in the Church. Hus declared that Bohemia should have the same freedom in regard to ecclesiastical affairs as other countries  and that approbation and condemnation should therefore be announced only with the permission of the state power. This was the doctrine of Wycliffe (Sermones, iii. 519, etc.).

There followed treatises from both parties, but no harmony was obtained. "Even if I should stand before the stake which has been prepared for me," Hus wrote at the time, "I would never accept the recommendation of the theological faculty." The synod did not produce any results but the king ordered a commission to continue the work of reconciliation. The doctors of the university demanded Hus and his followers approve the university's conception of the Church. According to this conception the pope is the head of the Church and the Cardinals are the body of the Church. Hus protested vigorously. The Hussite party seems to have made a great effort toward reconciliation. To the article that the Roman Church must be obeyed, they added only "so far as every pious Christian is bound". Stanislav ze Znojma and Štěpán Páleč protested against this addition and left the convention; they were exiled by the king, with two others.

Hus leaves Prague and appeals to Jesus Christ 
By this time, Hus's ideas had become widely accepted in Bohemia and there was broad resentment against the Church hierarchy. The attack on Hus by the pope and archbishop caused riots in parts of Bohemia. King Wenceslaus IV and his government took the side of Hus and the power of his adherents increased from day to day. Hus continued to preach in the Bethlehem Chapel. The churches of the city were put under the ban and the interdict was pronounced against Prague. To protect the city, Hus left and went into the countryside where he continued to preach and write.

Before Hus left Prague, he decided to take a step which gave a new dimension to his endeavors. He wanted to become a preacher and then taught at the university he studied at before. He no longer put his trust in an indecisive king, a hostile pope or an ineffective council. On 18 October 1412, he appealed to Jesus Christ as the supreme judge. By appealing directly to the highest Christian authority, Christ himself, he bypassed the laws and structures of the medieval Church. For the Bohemian Reformation, this step was as significant as the 95 theses posted in Wittenberg by Martin Luther in 1517.

After Hus left Prague for the country, he realized what a gulf there was between university education and theological speculation and the life of uneducated country priests and the laymen entrusted to their care. Therefore he started to write many texts in Czech, such as basics of the Christian faith or preachings, intended mainly for the priests whose knowledge of Latin was poor.

Writings of Hus and Wycliffe
Of the writings occasioned by these controversies, those of Hus on the Church, entitled De Ecclesia, were written in 1413 and have been most frequently quoted and admired or criticized yet their first ten chapters are an epitome of Wycliffe's work of the same title and the following chapters are an abstract of another of Wycliffe's works (De potentate papae) on the power of the pope. Wycliffe had written his book to oppose the common position that the Church consisted primarily of the clergy and Hus now found himself making the same point. He wrote his work at the castle of one of his protectors in Kozí Hrádek and sent it to Prague where it was publicly read in the Bethlehem Chapel. It was answered by Stanislav ze Znojma and Štěpán z Pálče (also Štěpán Páleč) with treatises of the same title.

After the most vehement opponents of Hus had left Prague, his adherents occupied the whole ground. Hus wrote his treatises and preached in the neighborhood of Kozí Hrádek. Bohemian Wycliffism was carried into Poland, Hungary, Croatia, and Austria. But in January 1413, a general council in Rome condemned the writings of Wycliffe and ordered them to be burned.

Council of Constance
King Wenceslaus's brother Sigismund of Hungary, who was "King of the Romans" (that is, head of the Holy Roman Empire though not then Emperor) and heir to the Bohemian crown was anxious to put an end to religious dissension within the Church. To put an end to the papal schism and to take up the long desired reform of the Church, he arranged for a general council to convene on 1 November 1414, at Konstanz (Constance). The Council of Constance (1414–1418) became the 16th ecumenical council recognized by the Catholic Church. Hus, willing to make an end of all dissensions, agreed to go to Constance, under Sigismund's promise of safe conduct.

Imprisonment and preparations for trial

It is not known whether Hus knew what his fate would be, however, he made his will before setting out. He started on his journey on 11 October 1414, arriving in Constance on 3 November 1414. The following day, the bulletins on the church doors announced that Michal z Německého Brodu (Michal de Causis) would be opposing Hus. In the beginning, Hus was at liberty under his safe conduct from Sigismund and lived at the house of a widow. But he continued celebrating Mass and preaching to the people, in violation of restrictions decreed by the Church. After a few weeks on 28 November 1414, his opponents succeeded in imprisoning him on the strength of a rumor that he intended to flee. He was first brought into the residence of a canon and then on 6 December 1414 into the prison of the Dominican monastery. Sigismund, as the guarantor of Hus's safety, was greatly angered and threatened the prelates with dismissal. The prelates convinced him that he could not be bound by promises to a heretic.

On 4 December 1414, John XXIII entrusted a committee of three bishops with a preliminary investigation against Hus. As was common practice, witnesses for the prosecution were heard but Hus was not allowed an advocate for his defense. His situation became worse after the downfall of John XXIII, who had left Constance to avoid abdicating. Hus had been the captive of John XXIII and in constant communication with his friends but now he was delivered to the bishop of Constance and brought to his castle, Gottlieben on the Rhine. Here he remained for 73 days, separated from his friends, chained day and night, poorly fed, and ill.

Trial

On 5 June 1415, he was tried for the first time and was transferred to a Franciscan monastery, where he spent the last weeks of his life. Extracts from his works were read and witnesses were heard. He refused all formulae of submission but declared himself willing to recant if his errors should be proven to him from the Bible. Hus conceded his veneration of Wycliffe and said that he could only wish his soul might some time attain unto that place where Wycliffe's was. On the other hand, he denied having defended Wycliffe's doctrine of The Lord's Supper or the forty-five articles; he had only opposed their summary condemnation. King Sigismund admonished him to deliver himself up to the mercy of the council, as he did not desire to protect a heretic.

At the last trial, on 8 June 1415, thirty-nine sentences were read to him. Of these, twenty-six had been excerpted from his book on the Church (De ecclesia), seven from his treatise against Páleč (Contra Palecz), and six from that against Stanislav ze Znojma (Contra Stanislaum). The danger of some of these doctrines to worldly power was explained to Sigismund to incite him against Hus. Hus again declared himself willing to submit if he could be convinced of errors. This declaration was considered an unconditional surrender, and he was asked to confess:
1. That he had erred in the theses which he had hitherto maintained;
2. That he renounced them for the future;
3. That he recanted them; and
4. That he declared the opposite of these sentences.

He asked to be exempted from recanting doctrines which he had never taught. Other doctrines, which the assembly considered erroneous, he was not willing to revoke and to act differently would be against his conscience. These words found no favorable reception. After the trial on 8 June, several other attempts were purportedly made to induce him to recant, which he resisted.

Condemnation

The condemnation of Jan Hus took place on 6 July 1415 in the presence of the assembly of the council in the cathedral. After the High Mass and Liturgy, Hus was led into the church. The Bishop of Lodi (then Giacomo Balardi Arrigoni) delivered an oration on the duty of eradicating heresy; various theses of Hus and Wycliffe and a report of his trial were then read.

An Italian prelate pronounced the sentence of condemnation upon Hus and his writings. Hus protested, saying that even at this hour he did not wish anything but to be convinced from Scripture. He fell upon his knees and asked God with a soft voice to forgive all his enemies. Then followed his degradation. He was dressed in priestly vestments and again asked to recant and again he refused. With curses, Hus's ornaments were taken from him, his priestly tonsure was destroyed. The sentence of the Church was pronounced, stripping him of all rights, and he was delivered to secular authorities. A tall paper hat was then put upon his head with the inscription "Haeresiarcha" (i.e., the leader of a heretical movement). Hus was led away to the stake under a strong guard of armed men.

Before his execution, Hus is said to have declared, "You may kill a weak goose [Hus is Czech for "goose"], but more powerful birds, eagles and falcons, will come after me." Luther modified the statement and reported that Hus had said that they might have roasted a goose, but that in a hundred years a swan would sing to whom they be forced to listen. In 1546, in his funeral sermon for Luther, Johannes Bugenhagen gave a further twist to Hus's declaration: "You may burn a goose, but in a hundred years will come a swan you will not be able to burn." Twenty years later, in 1566, Johannes Mathesius, Luther's first biographer, found Hus's prophecy to be evidence of Luther's divine inspiration.

Execution

At the place of execution, he knelt down, spread out his hands and prayed aloud. The executioner undressed Hus and tied his hands behind his back with ropes. His neck was bound with a chain to a stake around which wood and straw had been piled up so that it covered him to the neck. At the last moment, the imperial marshal, von Pappenheim, in the presence of the Count Palatine, asked Hus to recant and thus save his own life. Hus declined, stating:

Anecdotally, it has been claimed that the executioners had trouble intensifying the fire. An old woman then came to the stake and threw a relatively small amount of brushwood on it. Upon seeing her act, a suffering Hus then exclaimed, "O Sancta Simplicitas!". It is said that when he was about to expire, he cried out, "Christ, son of the Living God, have mercy on us!" (a variant of the Jesus Prayer). Hus's ashes were later thrown into the Rhine river as a means of preventing the veneration of his remains.

Aftermath

Bohemian Protest 
As news of Hus's death spread outrage was brewing from the local nobles and doctors. On the 2nd of September 1415, a document now called the Bohemian Protest was signed with corresponding attached wax seals by 100 notable people from Bohemia and Moravia in protest of Jan Hus's burning. There is evidence that four documents of this kind were made total, however only this one is known to survive and is currently held at the University of Edinburgh. The statement inside reads that "Master John Hus was a good, just and catholic man" that "consistently detested all error and heresies" and that anyone that believed that heresy was arising within Bohemia or Moravia to be "the worst of traitors".

Hussite Wars

Responding with horror to the execution of Hus, the people of Bohemia moved even more rapidly away from Papal teachings. Rome then pronounced a crusade against them (1 March 1420): Pope Martin V issued a Papal bull authorizing the execution of all supporters of Hus and Wycliffe. King Wenceslaus IV died in August 1419 and his brother, Sigismund of Hungary, was unable to establish a real government in Bohemia due to the Hussite revolt.

The Hussite community included most of the Czech population of the Kingdom of Bohemia. Under the leadership of Jan Žižka (c. 1360 – 1424) and later of Prokop the Great (c. 1380 – 1434)—both excellent commanders—the Hussites defeated the crusade and the other three crusades that followed (1419–1434). Fighting ended after a compromise between the Utraquist Hussites and the Catholic Council of Basel in 1436. It resulted in the Basel Compacts, in which the Catholic Church officially allowed Bohemia to practice its own version of Christianity (Hussitism). A century later as much as ninety percent of the inhabitants of the Czech Crown lands still followed Hussite teachings.

Hus's scholarship and teachings

Hus left reformatory writings. He translated Wycliffe's Trialogus, and was very familiar with his works on the body of Jesus, on the Church, on the power of the pope, and especially with his sermons. There are reasons to suppose that Wycliffe's doctrine of the Lord's Supper (consubstantiation rather than transubstantiation) had spread to Prague as early as 1399, with strong evidence that students returning from England had brought the work back with them. It gained an even wider circulation after it had been prohibited in 1403, and Hus preached and taught it. The doctrine was seized eagerly by the Taborites, who made it the central point of their system. According to their book, the Church is not the clerical hierarchy which was generally accepted as 'the Church'; the Church is the entire body of those who from eternity have been predestined for salvation. Christ, not the pope, is its head. It is no article of faith that one must obey the pope to be saved. Neither internal membership in the Church nor churchly offices and dignities are a surety that the persons in question are members of the true Church.

Hus's efforts were designed to rid the Church of its ethical abuses. The seeds of the Reformation are clear in Hus's and Wycliffe's writings. In explaining the plight of the average Christian in Bohemia, Hus wrote, "One pays for confession, for Mass, for the sacrament, for indulgences, for churching a woman, for a blessing, for burials, for funeral services and prayers. The very last penny which an old woman has hidden in her bundle for fear of thieves or robbery will not be saved. The villainous priest will grab it." (Macek, 16) After Hus's death, his followers, known as Hussites, split off into several groups including the Utraquists, Taborites and Orphans.

Apology of the Catholic Church
Nearly six centuries later in 1999, Pope John Paul II expressed "deep regret for the cruel death inflicted" on Hus and added "deep sorrow" for Hus's death and praised his "moral courage". Cardinal Miloslav Vlk of the Czech Republic was instrumental in crafting John Paul II's statement.

Hus and Feminism
Hus was also, unlike the vast majority of preachers at the time, an advocate for women and feminism. He believed women were given rights in the Bible. Hus stated that "Women were made in the image of God and should fear no man." He allowed women to preach and serve in battle, and they later fought in the Hussite wars.

Hus and the Czech language
Some sources mention documented use of the special symbols in Bible translations (1462), the Schaffhausen Bible, and handwritten notes in the bible. The symbol  (instead of ) came later. The book Orthographia Bohemica (1406) was attributed to Hus by František Palacký, but it is possible that it was compiled by another author from Charles University.

Legacy

A century after the Hussite Wars began, as many as 90% of inhabitants of the Czech lands were Hussites (although in the Utraquist tradition following a joint Utraquist—Catholic victory in the Hussite Wars). Bohemia was the site of one of the most significant pre-reformation movements, and there are still Protestant adherents remaining in modern times; though they no longer comprise the majority mainly due to historical reasons such as persecution of Protestants by the Catholic Habsburgs, particularly after the Battle of White Mountain in 1620; restrictions during the Communist rule; and also the ongoing secularization.

Jan Hus was a key contributor to Protestantism, whose teachings had a strong influence on the states of Europe and on Martin Luther. The Hussite Wars resulted in the Basel Compacts which allowed for a reformed Church in the Kingdom of Bohemia—almost a century before such developments would take place in the Lutheran Reformation. The Unitas Fratrum (or Moravian Church) is the modern day home of Hus's followers. Hus's extensive writings earned him a prominent place in Czech literary history.

In 1883 the Czech composer Antonin Dvorak composed his Hussite Overture based on melodies used by Hussite soldiers. It was often performed by the German conductor Hans von Bülow.

Professor Thomas Garrigue Masaryk used Hus's name in his speech at Geneva University on 6 July 1915, for defense against Austria and in July 1917 for the title of the first corps of troops of his legions in Russia.

Today, the Jan Hus Memorial is located at the Prague Old Town Square, and there are many smaller memorials in other towns throughout the Czech Republic.

In New York City, a church in Brooklyn (located at 153 Ocean Avenue), and a church and a theatre in Manhattan (located at 351 East 74th Street) are named for Hus: respectively the John Hus Moravian Church and the Jan Hus Playhouse. Although the Manhattan's church and theatre share a single building and management, the Playhouse's productions are usually non-religious or non-denominational.

A statue of Jan Hus was erected at the Union Cemetery in Bohemia, New York (on Long Island) by Czech immigrants to the New York area in 1893.

In contrast to the popular perception that Hus was a proto-Protestant, some Eastern Orthodox Christians have argued that his theology was far closer to Eastern Orthodox Christianity. Jan Hus is considered as a martyr saint in some jurisdictions of the Orthodox Church. The Czechoslovak Hussite Church claims to trace its origin to Hus, to be "neo-Hussite", and contains mixed Eastern Orthodox and Protestant elements. Nowadays he is considered a saint by the orthodox churches of Greece, Cyprus, Czechoslovakia and other several support them.

Hus was voted the greatest hero of the Czech nation in a 2015 survey by Czech Radio.

In popular culture
Hus appears in the Mezi proudy trilogy by writer Alois Jirásek.

Jan Hus is a major character of the "Hussite Revolutionary Trilogy" directed by Otakar Vávra. He is played by Zdeněk Štěpánek in the 1954 film Jan Hus.

Jan Hus is played by Rod Colbin in the 1977 American film John Hus.

Jan Hus is a major character in the stage play České nebe.

The Czech television film Jan Hus was released in 2015. It starred Matěj Hádek.

Hus appears in the 2022 film Medieval played by Viktor Krištof.

The lives of Hus and Petr Chelčický are the subject of the 2014 Hus a Chelčický book for older children, written and illustrated by Renáta Fučíková. The book won the Association of Czech Graphic Artists HOLLAR award for its illustrations.

Holidays commemorating Hus 
 Moravian Church – 6 July. Members of the Unitas Fratrum and Czech Brethren claim Hus as a spiritual forerunner.
  – Jan Hus Day (Den upálení mistra Jana Husa, literally: The day of burning of Master Jan Hus) on 6 July, the anniversary of Hus martyrdom. It is a public holiday in the Czech Republic.
  He is also commemorated as a martyr on the Calendar of Saints of the Evangelical Lutheran Church in America.

Famous followers of Jan Hus
 Jerome of Prague, Hus's friend and devoted follower shared his fate and on 30 May 1416 was also burned at Konstanz
 Jan Kardinál z Rejnštejna (1375–1428)
 Jan Žižka z Trocnova a Kalicha (c. 1360–1424), Czech general and Hussite leader
 Matěj z Knína (died 26 March 1410) (in German: Matthäus von Knin)
 Mikuláš Biskupec z Pelhřimova (1385 Pelhřimov – 1460 Poděbrady) (in Latin: Nicolaus Pilgramensis, in German: Nikolaus von Pelgrims)
 John Amos Comenius (1592–1670) – pastor, teacher, philosopher, educator and writer. The last bishop of Unitas Fratrum prior to its renewal, and pastor in the Moravian Church. Early champion of universal education, and education in one's mother language.

Gallery

Works
 Iohannes Hus. Postilla adumbrata, ed. G. Silagi (Corpus Christianorum. Continuatio Mediaevalis 261), Turnhout: Brepols Publishers
 De Ecclesia. The Church, Jan Hus; David S. Schaff, translator, New York, Charles Scribner's Sons, 1915.
 Letters of John Huss Written During His Exile and Imprisonment, Jan Hus; Campbell Mackenzie, translator, Edinburgh, William Whyte & co., 1846
 The letters of John Hus, Jan Hus; Herbert B. Workman; R. Martin Pope, London, Hodder and Stoughton, 1904.
 The Letters of John Hus, Jan Hus; Matthew Spinka, translator.
 The Letters of John Hus

See also

Orthographia bohemica, a treatise thought to have been written by Jan Hus
Jan Hus Presbyterian Church, a New York City parish of the Presbyterian Church (USA) and named after Jan Hus

Notes

References

Citations

Sources

Further reading
 Budgen, Victor. "On Fire For God." Evangelical Press, 2007.
 Fudge, Thomas A. Jan Hus: Religious Reform and Social Revolution in Bohemia, I.B. Tauris, London, 2010
 Fudge, Thomas A. The Memory and Morivation of Jan Hus, Medieval Priest and Martyr, Turnhout, Brepols, 2013
 Fudge, Thomas A. The Trial of Jan Hus: Medieval Heresy and Criminal Procedure, Oxford University Press, New York, 2013
 Fudge, Thomas A. Jan Hus Between Time and Eternity: Reconsidering a Medieval Heretic, Lexington Books, Lanham, MD, 2016
 Fudge, Thomas A. Living With Jan Hus: A Modern Journey Across a Medieval Landscape, Center for Christian Studies, Portland, OR, 2015

 Matthew Spinka: 'John Hus at the Council of Constance' Columbia University Press, 1965 (Includes the eye-witness account by Peter of Mladonovice)
 Count Lützow: Life & Times of Master John Hus, E. P. Dutton & Co. London, 1909
 Josef Macek: The Hussite Movement in Bohemia, Orbis, Prague, 1958
 Philip Schaff-Herzog: Encyclopedia of Religion
 Richard Friedenthal: Jan Hus. Der Ketzer und das Jahrhundert der Revolutionskriege. 2. Auflage 1987, 
 Wilhelm, J. (1910). Jan Hus. In The Catholic Encyclopedia. New York: Robert Appleton Company. Retrieved 16 May 2011 from New Advent: http://www.newadvent.org/cathen/07584b.htm
 Pietro Ratto: Il gioco dell'oca. I retroscena segreti del processo al riformatore Jan Hus, Bibliotheka Edizioni [it], Rome, 2020.

External links

John Hus, a movie produced by Faith for Today (1977)
Jan Hus, a Czechoslovak movie directed by Otakar Vávra (1955)
Hussitism and the heritage of Jan Hus  – Official Website of the Czech Republic
Final Declaration written on 1 July 1415 – Modern History Sourcebook, Fordham University
Letters of John Huss Written During His Exile and Imprisonment, with a preface by Martin Luther, by Jan Hus, François Paul Émile Boisnormand de Bonnechose, tr. Campbell Mackenzie, Edinburgh, William Whyte & Co., 1846
 
The life and times of John Huss "btm" format
Bohemian Reformation and Religious Practice – online translation of a Czech academic journal
Jan Hus and the Hussite Wars on Medieval Archives Podcast
Jan Hus Centre (historical Jan Hus Birth-house in Husinec, Czech Republic)

 
14th-century births
1415 deaths
14th-century Protestants
Hussite martyrs
People executed for heresy
Executed Czech people
14th-century Christian theologians
15th-century Christian theologians
Executed philosophers
Executed Roman Catholic priests
Christian humanists
Czech theologians
Czech philosophers
Czech religious leaders
Protestant Reformers
People excommunicated by the Catholic Church
Pre-Reformation saints of the Lutheran liturgical calendar
Charles University alumni
People from Husinec
Czech saints
People executed by the Papal States by burning
Czech evangelicals
15th-century executions
14th-century Bohemian writers
15th-century Bohemian writers
People executed for blasphemy
Academic staff of Charles University
Proto-Protestants